Mak Sensonita is a Cambodian actress. Sensonita is also a model for some magazines. She began her entertainment career in 2010.

Filmography
 2016: នាយខ្វាក់នាយខ្វិនឆ្លងភព
 2016: Chantrei
 2017: កូនពស់កេងកង
 2017: ព្រាយកន្ទោងខៀវ

See also
 List of Khmer film actors

References

External links
 
 

Cambodian film actresses
Living people
People from Phnom Penh
Year of birth missing (living people)